Afghān Muḥammad (b. 1611 d. 1648) was the ruler of Qasim Khanate, 17th century.

References 

17th-century Russian people
Year of birth missing
1648 deaths
17th-century monarchs in Europe